WPFG is a Christian radio station licensed to Carlisle, Pennsylvania, broadcasting on 91.3 MHz FM. The station serves the Harrisburg–Carlisle metropolitan statistical area and is owned by Cumberland Valley Christian Radio.

WPFG's programming includes Christian talk and teaching shows such as Grace to You with John MacArthur, Revive our Hearts with Nancy Leigh DeMoss, Truth for Life with Alistair Begg, Renewing Your Mind with R.C. Sproul, and Answers in Genesis with Ken Ham.

References

External links
 

 
 

PFG